Aniassué (also spelled Agniassué and Aniasué) is a town in eastern Ivory Coast. It is a sub-prefecture of Abengourou Department in Indénié-Djuablin Region, Comoé District.

Aniassué was a commune until March 2012 when it was abolished along with 1,126 others nationwide.
In 2014, the population of the sub-prefecture of Aniassué was 40,498.

Villages
The twelve villages of the sub-prefecture of Aniassué and their population in 2014 are:

References

Sub-prefectures of Indénié-Djuablin
Former communes of Ivory Coast